"I Love You, California" is the state song and regional anthem of the U.S. state of California, originally published in 1913. It was adopted in 1951 and reconfirmed in 1987 as the official state song.

The lyrics were written by Francis Beatty Silverwood (1863–1924), a Los Angeles clothier, and the words were subsequently put to music by Abraham Franklin Frankenstein (1873–1934), then conductor of the Orpheum Theatre Orchestra, with an inaugural performance by Mary Garden. Frankenstein was a cousin of the San Francisco Chronicle's long-time music and art critic Alfred V. Frankenstein. The song was published by Hatch & Loveland, Music Printers, Los Angeles, California, and copyrighted by F.B. Silverwood in 1913.  It was the official song of expositions held in San Francisco and San Diego in 1915.

History

Premiere 

Later in 1913, the song was introduced by opera star Mary Garden, associated with the Chicago Grand Opera at that time. "Mary Garden stopped Grand Opera to make this California song famous," read the notices virtually ensuring the popularity and success of the new song. The renowned soprano wrote on stationery from the Hotel Alexandria in Los Angeles:

Played aboard the SS Ancon 

"I Love You, California" was played aboard the steamship Ancon, which on August 14, 1914, became the first merchant ship to pass through the Panama Canal.

State legislative designation 
In 1951, the State Legislature passed a resolution designating it as California's state song.  California Government Code section 421.7 states, "I Love You, California", a song published in 1913 with lyrics by F.B. Silverwood and music by A.F. Frankenstein, is an official state song."

In 1987, "I Love You, California" became the official state song by law.

Commercial use
In late 2012, Jeep began running a TV advertisement in California, with "I Love You, California" as the soundtrack and visuals showing the Californian state flower, Californian flag, and other Californian icons.

The song also serves as the theme music for the state’s public television human interest series “California’s Golden Parks”, presented by Huell Howser.

In popular culture

An arrangement of the song is heard when the player builds the Golden Gate Bridge in Civilization VI: Gathering Storm, accompanied by the first four lines of Percy Bysshe Shelley's poem A Bridal Song.

Lyrics

Other non-official state songs 

During the years following, several attempts were made to make other songs the official state song. In 1921, Lynden Ellsworth Behymer (1862–1947), impresario, and Bessie Bartlett Frankel (Mrs. Cecil Frankel) (1884–1959)], donated a sum of money to the California Federation of Music Clubs to hold a contest for lyrics to a state song "of real value."  The judges were Benjamin Franklin Field (1868–1960), chairman of the federation and chairman of the committee of judges, Grace Atherton Dennen (1874–1927), editor and publisher of The Lyric West, and Blanche Robinson (Mrs. Martin Hennion Robinson) (née Williams; 1883–1969), composer.  The original deadline, October 1, 1921, was extended to December 31, 1921 and the prize money was increased to $100. The judges selected Mary Lennox of San Francisco on January 17, 1922, as the winner was "California, Sweet Homeland of Mine":

See also 
List of U.S. state songs

References

External links
1913 recording by Elsie Baker
Sheet music

California, I Love You
Songs about California
Music of California
1913 songs